The following lists events that happened during 1849 in Liberia.

Incumbents
President: Joseph Jenkins Roberts
Vice President: Nathaniel Brander
Chief Justice: Samuel Benedict

Events

May
 May 1 - General elections and a constitutional referendum were held.

Full date unknown
 The Liberian government gains the territory that would become Grand Cape Mount County by signing a treaty with the local inhabitants.

References

 
Years of the 19th century in Liberia
Liberia
Liberia